The cyclosporins are a group of macrolides isolated from fungi and used as immunosuppresant drugs, for example after transplant surgery. They are nonribosomal peptide synthesized by cyclosporin synthetase.

Cyclosporin A (ciclosporin)
Cyclosporin B
Cyclosporin C
Cyclosporin D
Cyclosporin E
Cyclosporin F
Cyclosporin G

References 

Cyclic peptides
Immunosuppressants
Fungi and humans